The Mahdist War (1881–1899) was a war between the Mahdist Sudanese of the religious leader Muhammad Ahmad bin Abd Allah, who had proclaimed himself the "Mahdi" of Islam (the "Guided One"), and the forces of the Khedivate of Egypt, initially, and later the forces of Britain. Eighteen years of war resulted in the nominally joint-rule state of the Anglo-Egyptian Sudan (1899–1956), a de jure condominium of the British Empire and the Kingdom of Egypt in which Britain had de facto control over the Sudan. The Sudanese launched several unsuccessful invasions of their neighbours, expanding the scale of the conflict to include not only Britain and Egypt but also the Italian Empire, the Congo Free State and the Ethiopian Empire.

The British participation in the war is called the Sudan campaign. Other names for this war include the Mahdist Revolt, the Anglo–Sudan War and the Sudanese Mahdist Revolt.

Background
Following the invasion by Muhammad Ali in 1819, Sudan was governed by an Egyptian administration. Because of the heavy taxes it imposed and because of the bloody start of the Turkish-Egyptian rule in Sudan, this colonial system was resented by the Sudanese people.

Throughout the period of Turco-Egyptian rule, many segments of the Sudanese population suffered extreme hardship because of the system of taxation imposed by the central government. Under this system, a flat tax was imposed on farmers and small traders and collected by government-appointed tax collectors from the Sha'iqiyya tribe of northern Sudan. In bad years, and especially during times of drought and famine, farmers were unable to pay the high taxes. Fearing the brutal and unjust methods of the Sha'iqiyya, many farmers fled their villages in the fertile Nile Valley to the remote areas of Kordofan and Darfur. These migrants, known as "jallaba" after their loose-fitting style of dress, began to function as small traders and middlemen for the foreign trading companies that had established themselves in the cities and towns of central Sudan. The jallaba were also known to be slave trading tribes.

By the middle 19th century the Ottoman Imperial subject administration in Egypt was in the hands of Khedive Ismail. Khedive Ismail's spending had put Egypt into huge debt, and when his financing of the Suez Canal started to crumble, the United Kingdom stepped in and repaid his loans in return for controlling shares in the canal. As the most direct route to India, the jewel in the British Crown, the Suez Canal was of paramount strategic importance, and British commercial and imperial interests dictated the need to seize or otherwise control it. Thus an ever-increasing British role in Egyptian affairs seemed necessary. With Khedive Ismail's spending and corruption causing instability, in 1873 the British government supported a program whereby an Anglo-French debt commission assumed responsibility for managing Egypt's fiscal affairs. This commission eventually forced Khedive Ismail to abdicate in favor of his son Tawfiq in 1877, leading to a period of political turmoil.

Also in 1873, Ismail had appointed General Charles "Chinese" Gordon Governor of the Equatorial Provinces of Sudan. For the next three years, General Gordon fought against a native chieftain of Darfur, Al-Zubayr Rahma Mansur.

Upon Ismail's abdication in 1877, Gordon found himself with dramatically decreased support. Exhausted by years of work, he resigned his post in 1880 and left early the next year. His policies were soon abandoned by the new governors, but the anger and discontent of the dominant Arab minority was left unaddressed.

Although the Egyptians were fearful of the deteriorating conditions, the British refused to get involved,  as Foreign Secretary Earl Granville declared, "Her Majesty’s Government are in no way responsible for operations in the Sudan".

Historical development of the conflict

Mahdi uprising

Among the forces historians see as the causes of the uprising are ethnic Sudanese anger at the foreign Turkish Ottoman rulers, Muslim revivalist anger at the Turks' lax religious standards and willingness to appoint non-Muslims such as the Christian Charles Gordon to high positions, and Sudanese Sufi resistance to "dry, scholastic Islam of Egyptian officialdom." Another widely reported potential source of frustration was the Turco-Egyptian abolition of the slave trade, one of the main sources of income in Sudan at the time.

In the 1870s, a Muslim cleric named Muhammad Ahmad preached renewal of the faith and liberation of the land, and began attracting followers. Soon in open revolt against the Egyptians, Muhammad Ahmad proclaimed himself the Mahdi, the promised redeemer of the Islamic world. In August 1881 the then-governor of the Sudan, Raouf Pasha, sent two companies of infantry each with one machine gun to arrest him. The captains of the two companies were each promised promotion if their soldiers were the ones to return the Mahdi to the governor. Both companies disembarked from the steamer that had brought them up the Nile to Aba Island and approached the Mahdi's village from separate directions. Arriving simultaneously, each force began to fire blindly on the other, allowing the Mahdi's scant followers to attack and destroy each force in turn at the Battle of Aba.

The Mahdi then began a strategic retreat to Kordofan, where he was at a distance from the seat of government in Khartoum. This movement, couched as a triumphal progress, incited many of the Arab tribes to rise in support of the Jihad the Mahdi had declared against the Turkish oppressors.

The Mahdi and the forces of his Ansar arrived in the Nuba Mountains of south Kordofan around early November 1881. Another Egyptian expedition dispatched from Fashoda arrived around one month later; this force was ambushed and slaughtered on the night of 9 December 1881.  Consisting, like the earlier Aba Island force, of two 200 man strong Egyptian raised infantry companies, this time augmented with an additional 1,000 native irregulars, the force commander – Colonel Rashid Bay Ahman – and all his principal leadership team, died. It is unknown if any of Colonel Ahman's troops survived.

As these military incursions were happening, the Mahdi legitimized his movement by drawing deliberate parallels to the life of the Prophet Muhammad. He called his followers Ansar, after the people who greeted the Prophet in Medina, and he called his flight from the British, the hijrah, after the Prophet's flight from the Quraysh. The Mahdi also appointed commanders to represent three of the four Righteous Caliphs; for example, he announced that Abdullahi ibn Muhammad, his eventual successor, represented Abu Bakr Al Sidiq, the Prophet's successor.

The Egyptian administration in the Sudan, now thoroughly concerned by the scale of the uprising, assembled a force of 4,000 troops under Yusef Pasha. In mid 1882, this force approached the Mahdist gathering, whose members were poorly clothed, half starving, and armed only with sticks and stones. However, supreme overconfidence led the Egyptian army into camping within sight of the Mahdist 'army' without posting sentries. The Mahdi led a dawn assault on 7 June 1882, which slaughtered the army to a man. The rebels gained vast stores of arms and ammunition, military clothing and other supplies.

Hicks expedition

With the Egyptian government now passing largely under British control, the European powers became increasingly aware of the troubles in the Sudan. The British advisers to the Egyptian government gave tacit consent for another expedition. Throughout the summer of 1883, Egyptian troops were concentrated at Khartoum, eventually reaching the strength of around 7,300 infantry, 1,000 cavalry, and an artillery force of 300 personnel hauling between them 4 Krupp 80mm field guns, 10 brass mountain guns and 6 Nordenfeldt machine guns. This force was placed under the command of a retired British Indian Staff Corps officer William Hicks and twelve European officers. The force was, in the words of Winston Churchill, "perhaps the worst army that has ever marched to war"—unpaid, untrained, and undisciplined, its soldiers having more in common with their enemies than with their officers.

El Obeid, the city whose siege Hicks had intended to relieve, had already fallen by the time the expedition left Khartoum, but Hicks continued anyway, although not confident of his chances of success. Upon his approach, the Mahdi assembled an army of about 40,000 men and drilled them rigorously in the art of war, equipping them with the arms and ammunition captured in previous battles. On 3 and 4 November 1883, when Hicks' forces actually offered battle, the Mahdist army was a credible military force, which utterly defeated Hicks' army—only about 500 Egyptians survived—at the Battle of El Obeid.

Egyptian evacuation
At this time, the British Empire was increasingly entrenching itself in the workings of the Egyptian government. Egypt was groaning under a barely maintainable debt repayment structure for her enormous European debt. For the Egyptian government to avoid further interference from its European creditors, it had to ensure that the debt interest was paid on time, every time. To this end, the Egyptian treasury, initially crippled by corruption and bureaucracy, was placed by the British almost entirely under the control of a 'Financial Advisor', who exercised the power of veto over all matters of financial policy.  The holders of this office—first Sir Auckland Colvin, and later Sir Edgar Vincent—were instructed to exercise the greatest possible parsimony in Egypt's financial affairs. Maintaining the garrisons in the Sudan was costing the Egyptian government over 100,000 Egyptian pounds a year, an unmaintainable expense.

It was therefore decided by the Egyptian government, under some coercion from their British comptrollers, that the Egyptian presence in the Sudan should be withdrawn and the country left to some form of self-government, likely headed by the Mahdi. The withdrawal of the Egyptian garrisons stationed throughout the country, such as those at Sennar, Tokar and Sinkat, was therefore threatened unless it was conducted in an orderly fashion. The Egyptian government asked for a British officer to be sent to the Sudan to co-ordinate the withdrawal of the garrisons. It was hoped that Mahdist forces would judge an attack on a British subject to be too great a risk, and hence allow the withdrawal to proceed without incident. It was proposed to send Charles 'Chinese' Gordon. Gordon was a gifted officer, who had gained renown commanding Imperial Chinese forces during the Taiping Rebellion. However, he was also renowned for his aggression and rigid personal honour, which, in the eyes of several prominent British officials in Egypt, made him unsuitable for the task. Sir Evelyn Baring (later the Earl of Cromer), the British Consul-general in Egypt, was particularly opposed to Gordon's appointment, only reluctantly being won over by the British press and public. Gordon was eventually given the mission, but he was to be accompanied by the much more level-headed and reliable Colonel John Stewart. It was intended that Stewart, while nominally Gordon's subordinate, would act as a brake on the latter and ensure that the Sudan was evacuated quickly and peacefully.

Gordon left England on 18 January 1884 and arrived in Cairo on the evening of 24 January. Gordon was largely responsible for drafting his own orders, along with proclamations from the Khedive announcing Egypt's intentions to leave the Sudan.  Gordon's orders, by his own request, were unequivocal and left little room for misinterpretation.

Gordon arrived in Khartoum on 18 February, and immediately became apprised of the vast difficulty of the task. Egypt's garrisons were scattered widely across the country; three—Sennar, Tokar and Sinkat—were under siege, and the majority of the territory between them was under the control of the Mahdi. There was no guarantee that, if the garrisons were to sortie, even with the clear intention of withdrawing, they would not be cut to pieces by the Mahdist forces. Khartoum's Egyptian and European population was greater than all the other garrisons combined, including 7,000 Egyptian troops and 27,000 civilians and the staffs of several embassies. Although the pragmatic approach would have been to secure the safety of the Khartoum garrison and abandon the outlying fortifications and their troops to the Mahdi, Gordon became increasingly reluctant to leave the Sudan until "every one who wants to go down [the Nile] is given the chance to do so," feeling it would be a slight on his honour to abandon any Egyptian soldiers to the Mahdi. He also became increasingly fearful of the Mahdi's potential to cause trouble in Egypt if allowed control of the Sudan, leading to a conviction that the Mahdi must be "crushed," by British troops if necessary, to assure the stability of the region. It is debated whether or not Gordon deliberately remained in Khartoum longer than strategically sensible, seemingly intent on becoming besieged within the town. Gordon's brother, H. W. Gordon, was of the opinion that the British officers could easily have escaped from Khartoum up until 14 December 1884.

Whether or not it was the Mahdi's intention, in March 1884, the Sudanese tribes to the north of Khartoum, who had previously been sympathetic or at least neutral towards the Egyptian authorities, rose in support of the Mahdi. The telegraph lines between Khartoum and Cairo were cut on 15 March, severing communication between Khartoum and the outside world.

Siege of Khartoum

Gordon's position in Khartoum was very strong, as the city was bordered to the north and east by the Blue Nile, to the west by the White Nile, and to the south by ancient fortifications looking on to a vast expanse of desert. Gordon had food for an estimated six months, several million rounds of ammunition in store, with the capacity to produce a further 50,000 rounds per week, and 7,000 Egyptian soldiers. But outside the walls, the Mahdi had mustered about 50,000 Dervish soldiers, and as time went on, the chances of a successful breakout became slim. Gordon had enthusiastically supported the idea of recalling the notorious former slaver Pasha Zobeir from exile in Egypt to organize and lead a popular uprising against the Mahdi. When this idea was vetoed by the British government, Gordon proposed a number of alternative means to salvage his situation successively to his British superiors. All were similarly vetoed. Among them were:
 Making a breakout southwards along the Blue Nile towards Abyssinia (now Ethiopia), which would have enabled him to collect the garrisons stationed along that route. The window for navigation of the upper reaches of that river was very narrow.
 Requesting Mohammedan regiments from India.
 Requesting several thousand Turkish troops be sent to quell the uprising.
 Visiting the Mahdi himself to explore a possible solution.
Eventually it became impossible for Gordon to be relieved without British troops. An expedition was duly dispatched under Sir Garnet Wolseley, but as the level of the White Nile fell through the winter, muddy 'beaches' at the foot of the walls were exposed. With starvation and cholera rampant in the city and the Egyptian troops' morale shattered, Gordon's position became untenable and the city fell on 26 January 1885, after a siege of 313 days.

Nile campaign

The British Government, reluctantly and late, but under strong pressure from public opinion, sent a relief column under Sir Garnet Wolseley to relieve the Khartoum garrison. This was described in some British papers as the 'Gordon Relief Expedition', a term Gordon strongly objected to. After defeating the Mahdists at the Battle of Abu Klea on 17 January 1885, the column arrived within sight of Khartoum at the end of January, only to find they were too late: the city had fallen two days earlier, and Gordon and the garrison had been massacred.

Suakin Expedition

The British also sent an expeditionary force under Lieutenant-General Sir Gerald Graham, including an Indian contingent, to Suakin in March 1885. Though successful in the two actions it fought, it failed to change the military situation and was withdrawn. These events temporarily ended British and Egyptian involvement in Sudan, which passed completely under the control of the Mahdists.

Muhammad Ahmad died soon after his victory, on 22 June 1885, and was succeeded by the Khalifa Abdallahi ibn Muhammad, who proved to be an able, albeit ruthless, ruler of the Mahdiyah (the Mahdist state).

Equatoria expedition

Between 1886 and 1889 a British expedition to relieve the Egyptian governor of Equatoria made its way through central Africa. The governor, Emin Pasha, was rescued, but the expedition was not without its failures, such as the disaster that befell the rear column.

Ethiopian campaigns
According to the Hewett Treaty of 3 June 1884, Ethiopia agreed to facilitate the evacuation of Egyptian garrisons in southern Sudan. In September 1884, Ethiopia reoccupied the province of Bogos, which had been occupied by Egypt, and began a long campaign to relieve the Egyptian garrisons besieged by the Mahdists. The bitter campaigning was led by the Emperor Yohannes IV and Ras Alula. The Ethiopians under Ras Alula achieved a victory in the Battle of Kufit on 23 September 1885.

Between November 1885 and February 1886, Yohannes IV was putting down a revolt in Wollo. In January 1886, a Mahdist army invaded Ethiopia, seized Dembea, burned the Mahbere Selassie monastery, and advanced on Chilga. King Tekle Haymanot of Gojjam led a successful counteroffensive as far as Gallabat in the Sudan in January 1887. A year later, in January 1888, the Mahdists returned, defeating Tekle Haymanot at Sar Weha and sacking Gondar. This culminated in the end of the Ethiopian theatre at the Battle of Gallabat

Italian campaign and Anglo-Egyptian reconquest

In the intervening years, Egypt had not renounced her claims over Sudan, and the British authorities considered these claims legitimate. Under strict control by British administrators, Egypt's economy had been rebuilt, and the Egyptian army reformed, this time trained and led by British officers and non-commissioned officers. The situation evolved in a way that allowed Egypt, both politically and militarily, to reconquer Sudan.

Since 1890, Italian troops had defeated Mahdist troops in the Battle of Serobeti and the First Battle of Agordat. In December 1893, Italian colonial troops and Mahdists fought again in the Second Battle of Agordat; Ahmed Ali campaigned against the Italian forces in eastern Sudan and led about 10–12,000 men east from Kassala, encountering 2,400 Italians and their Eritrean Ascaris commanded by Colonel Arimondi. The Italians won again, and the outcome of the battle constituted "the first decisive victory yet won by Europeans against the Sudanese revolutionaries". A year later, Italian colonial forces seized Kassala after the successful Battle of Kassala.

In 1891 a Catholic priest, Father Joseph Ohrwalder, escaped from captivity in Sudan. In 1895 the erstwhile Governor of Darfur, Rudolf Carl von Slatin, managed to escape from the Khalifa's prison. Besides providing vital intelligence on the Mahdist dispositions, both men wrote detailed accounts of their experiences in Sudan. Written in collaboration with Reginald Wingate, a proponent of the reconquest of Sudan, both works emphasized the savagery and barbarism of the Mahdists, and through the wide publicity they received in Britain, served to influence public opinion in favour of military intervention.

In 1896, when Italy suffered a heavy defeat at the hands of the Ethiopians at Adwa, the Italian position in East Africa was seriously weakened. The Mahdists threatened to retake Kassala, which they had lost to the Italians in 1894. The British government judged it politic to assist the Italians by making a military demonstration in northern Sudan. This coincided with the increased threat of French encroachment on the Upper Nile regions. Lord Cromer, judging that the Conservative-Unionist government in power would favour taking the offensive, managed to extend the demonstration into a full-fledged invasion. In 1897, the Italians gave back to the British the control of Kassala, returning in Italian Eritrea, in order to get international recognition of their colony.

Herbert Kitchener, the new Sirdar (commander) of the Anglo-Egyptian Army, received his marching orders on 12 March, and his forces entered Sudan on the 18th. Numbering at first 11,000 men, Kitchener's force was armed with the most modern military equipment of the time, including Maxim machine-guns and modern artillery, and was supported by a flotilla of gunboats on the Nile. Their advance was slow and methodical, while fortified camps were built along the way, and two separate  Narrow gauge railways were hastily constructed from a station at Wadi Halfa: the first rebuilt Isma'il Pasha's abortive and ruined former line south along the east bank of the Nile to supply the 1896 Dongola Expedition and a second, carried out in 1897, was extended along a new line directly across the desert to Abu Hamad—which they captured in the Battle of Abu Hamed on 7 August 1897—to supply the main force moving on Khartoum. It was not until 7 June 1896 that the first serious engagement of the campaign occurred, when Kitchener led a 9,000 strong force that wiped out the Mahdist garrison at Ferkeh.

In 1898, in the context of the scramble for Africa, the British decided to reassert Egypt's claim on Sudan. An expedition commanded by Kitchener was organised in Egypt. It was composed of 8,200 British soldiers and 17,600 Egyptian and Sudanese soldiers commanded by British officers. The Mahdist forces (sometimes called the Dervishes) were more numerous, numbering more than 60,000 warriors, but lacked modern weapons.

After defeating a Mahdist force in the Battle of Atbara in April 1898, the Anglo-Egyptians reached Omdurman, the Mahdist capital, in September. The bulk of the Mahdist army attacked, but was cut down by British machine-guns and rifle fire.

The remnant, with the Khalifa Abdullah, fled to southern Sudan. During the pursuit, Kitchener's forces met a French force under Major Jean-Baptiste Marchand at Fashoda, resulting in the Fashoda Incident. They finally caught up with Abdullah at Umm Diwaykarat, where he was killed, effectively ending the Mahdist regime.

The casualties for this campaign were:

Sudan: 30,000 dead, wounded, or captured
Britain: 700+ British, Egyptian and Sudanese dead, wounded, or captured.

Aftermath

The British set up a new colonial system, the Anglo-Egyptian administration, which effectively established British domination over Sudan. This ended with the independence of Sudan in 1956.

Military textiles of the Mahdiyya

Textiles played an important role in the organisation of the Mahdist forces. The flags, banners, and patched tunics (jibba) worn and used in battle by the anṣār
had both military and religious significance. As a result, textile items like these make up a large portion of the booty which was taken back to Britain after the British victory over the Mahdist forces at the Battle of Omdurman in 1899. Mahdist flags and jibbas were adapted from traditional styles of textiles used by adherents of Sufi orders in Sudan. As the Mahdist war progressed, these textiles became more standardised and specifically colour coded to denote military rank and regiment.

Mahdist flags

Sufi flags typically feature the Muslim shahada – "There is no God but Allah; Muḥammad is Allah’s Messenger" – and the name of the sect’s founder, an individual usually regarded as a saint. The Mahdī adapted this form of flag for military purposes. A quotation from the Koran was added – "Yā allah yā ḥayy yā qayūm yā ḍhi’l-jalāl wa’l-ikrām" (O Allah! O Ever-living, O Everlasting, O Lord of Majesty and Generosity) – and the highly charged claim – "Muḥammad al-Mahdī khalifat rasūl Allah" (Muḥammad al-Mahdī is the successor of Allah’s messenger).

After the fall of Khartoum, a "Tailor of Flags" was set up in Omdurman. The production of flags became standardised and regulations concerning the colour and inscriptions of the flags were established. As the Mahdist forces became more organized, the word "flag" (rayya) came to mean a division of troops or a body of troops under a commander. The flags were colour coded to direct soldiers of the three main divisions of the Mahdist army – the Black, Green and Red Banners (rāyāt).

The Mahdist jibba

The patched muraqqa'a, and later, the jibba, was a garment traditionally worn by followers of Sufi religious orders. The ragged, patched garment symbolised a rejection of material wealth by its wearer and a commitment to a religious way of life. Muhammad Ahmad al-Mahdi decreed that this garment should be worn by all his soldiers in battle. The decision to adopt the religious garment as military dress, enforced unity and cohesion among his forces, and eliminated traditional visual markers differentiating potentially fractious tribes.  During the years of conflict between Mahdist and Anglo-Egyptian forces at the end of the 19th century, the Mahdist military jibba became increasingly stylised and patches became colour-coded to denote the rank and military division of the wearer.

See also
 History of Sudan (1884-1898)
 Northern Africa Railroad Development
 List of journalists killed during the Sudan campaign
 :Category:People of the Mahdist War
 Millennarianism in colonial societies

References and notes

Footnotes

Citations

Further reading
 Churchill, The River War
 Too late for Gordon and Khartoum, 1887
 Ten years captivity in the Mahdist camp
 Suakin 1885
 The Downfall of the Dervishes, 1898
 Sudan Campaign 1896–1899

External links

 The British Expedition to Rescue Emin Pasha

 
African resistance to colonialism
Wars involving the United Kingdom
Wars involving Sudan
Wars involving the states and peoples of Africa
19th-century military history of the United Kingdom
Wars involving Egypt
Rebellions in Africa
Rebellions against the British Empire
Wars involving British India
19th century in Egypt
19th century in Africa
Proxy wars